Dime to Retire is a 1955 Warner Bros. Looney Tunes cartoon directed by Robert McKimson. The cartoon was released on September 3, 1955, and stars Daffy Duck and Porky Pig.

Plot
Daffy works as an unscrupulous hotel-keeper and requires only a dime from Porky to stay at his hotel initially. He then proceeds to send various animals up to disturb Porky's sleep (in room #16) and makes Porky pay a fee per animal to get rid of them while Daffy slowly increases the fee amount as each new animal causes problems.

It initially starts with Daffy sending a mouse to Porky's room via a pneumatic tube; the mouse eats a stick of celery loudly thereby disrupting Porky's sleep. Porky calls for its removal, the extermination of which by cat has a $5 pussy cat fee. The cat, which refuses to leave the bed, is then eliminated by a boxer dog for a fee of $10, which repeatedly box-punches Porky after Daffy sounds a hidden boxing bell for room #16. The dog is then evicted by a $26 lion, which tries to eat Porky; the lion is eradicated by an elephant for a $72 fee; the elephant engulfs the whole room and is exterminated (driven off) by the celery-eating mouse for a $666 fee, thereby wrecking Porky's room in the elephant's panic and causing the whole loop to repeat.

Eventually, Porky gets fed up with the lousy service and decides to leave without paying Daffy the initial room fee of 10¢. In response to Porky's "deadbeat" behavior, Daffy holds Porky's baggage which has Acme blasting powder in it, which Porky deliberately sets off shortly after he starts his car (the exhaust pipe lights the powder leaking from the briefcase) as Daffy walks inside the hotel. Just as Porky departs, the lit fuse follows Daffy into his hotel office; the hotel explodes and has to be closed for repairs. The short ends with Daffy asking the composer for “a little traveling music, please” (a reference to The Jackie Gleason Show) before running out of the now-ruined hotel and running away with his trade-mark laugh in pain as his tail feathers are on fire.

Home media
Dime to Retire is available, uncensored and uncut, on the Looney Tunes Superstars-Daffy Duck: Frustrated Fowl DVD. However, it was cropped to widescreen, like in the theatrical release. It was also released on the VHS, Daffy Duck: Madcap Mania.

References

External links
 

1955 animated films
1955 short films
1955 films
Looney Tunes shorts
Films directed by Robert McKimson
Daffy Duck films
Porky Pig films
Films set in hotels
1950s Warner Bros. animated short films
Films scored by Milt Franklyn
1950s English-language films